Murray Williamson (born January 13, 1934) is a retired ice hockey player and coach. Williamson was an All American at the University of Minnesota in 1959 and played, coached and managed in the United States Hockey League with the St. Paul Steers. He coached the United States National teams in the World Hockey Championships in 1967, 1969 and 1971 and the United States Olympic teams in 1968 and 1972. The 1972 team won the silver medal at the 1972 Winter Olympics held in Sapporo, Japan. He was instrumental in the founding of the Midwest Junior Hockey League in 1973 (now called the United States Hockey League) and was the coach and general manager of the first United States National Junior team that participated in the inaugural World Junior Tournament held in Leningrad, Russia in 1973.

Born in Winnipeg, Manitoba, Canada, Williamson was inducted into the United States Hockey Hall of Fame in 2005,the Massachusetts Hockey Hall of Fame in 2000, the Manitoba Hockey Hall of Fame in 2009 and the University of Minnesota Athletic Hall of Fame in 2008. He was awarded the Legend of Hobey Baker Award in 2005 for his contributions to college hockey. He is featured in the book "Striking Silver" the untold story  of America's forgotten hockey team, published by Sorts Publishing LLC in 2006 by the Caraccioli brothers

Awards and honors

External links
 Murraywilliamson.org
 United States Hockey Hall of Fame bio
 

1934 births
American men's ice hockey left wingers
American ice hockey coaches
American people of Canadian descent
Ice hockey people from Manitoba
Living people
United States Hockey Hall of Fame inductees
AHCA Division I men's ice hockey All-Americans